The sport of snooker has utilised a world rankings system since 1975, used to seed players on the World Snooker Tour for tournaments. Originally rankings were published once a year, at the culmination of the season, however, since 2010, the rankings have been changed to be updated after every ranking tournament. The number one rank has been held by eleven players; Ray Reardon was the first to hold the position, and was followed by Cliff Thorburn, Steve Davis, Stephen Hendry, John Higgins, Mark Williams, Ronnie O'Sullivan, Neil Robertson, Mark Selby, Judd Trump and Ding Junhui.

Hendry held the number one position for the longest time under the annual format, holding it for nine years in total. Since it changed to a rolling format in 2010, Selby has held the title longer than anyone else.

History 

The sport of professional snooker first adopted a ranking system for the 1975–76 season, which saw Ray Reardon ranked in the top position. An Order of Merit was published in the 1975/76 season to determine the seedings for events, and the first set of official rankings the following year used the same criteria. Certain events carried ranking points, and at the end of the season, they were tallied. The World Snooker Championship originally was the only event to offer ranking points, until the 1982 International Open. Over the next 22 seasons, five men held the first position; Reardon (1976/77 to 1980/81), Cliff Thorburn (1981/82), Reardon again for 1982/83, Steve Davis (1983/84 to 1989/90) and Stephen Hendry (1990/91 to 1997/98). From 1998/99 to 2009/10, the title was shared by Ronnie O'Sullivan (five seasons), John Higgins (three seasons) and Mark Williams (three seasons), while Hendry regained the position for the 2006/07 season. In the first 34 years of the world rankings, only seven players held the number one position.

For the 2010–11 snooker season, the world rankings were changed to be updated after each tournament carrying ranking points. This was altered from the 2014–15 snooker season, where ranking points were based entirely on the prize money won from qualifying events. Since the introduction of the new system, Higgins, Neil Robertson, Williams, Mark Selby, Judd Trump, Ding Junhui, and O'Sullivan have all attained the number one rank. Selby has also seven seasons ranked in first place, putting him in joint second place overall with Reardon, Davis and O'Sullivan (seven times each) and behind Hendry (nine times).

List of players 
Hendry holds the record for most seasons at number one under the traditional system, with nine seasons (1990/1991–1997/1998 and again in 2006–07). His first spell of eight consecutive seasons in this position is also a record. Under the rolling ranking format, Mark Selby holds both the total and consecutive records.

Periods 
The snooker players ranked number one in the world are listed below for each period since the introduction of the ranking system.

Total time spent at number one

Annual format (1975–2010)

Rolling format (2010–present) 

† as of

Players ranked number one at the start of the season

Per season

Per frequency

See also

Notes

References

External links 
 Ranking Records: Number One at Pro Snooker Blog
 Official list

 
Number-one players
Lists of sports superlatives